Mohammad Toaha (2 January 1922 – 29 November 1987) was a language activist of the 1952 language movement and a prominent left-wing politician from Bangladesh.

Early life and education
Toaha was born on 2 January 1922 at Hajirhat village in Ramgati of Lakshmipur District. He finished his matriculation under Calcutta University in 1939. Later he received his MA in political science in 1948.

Political career
Toaha participated as an activist in Sylhet Referendum under Abdul Hamid Khan Bhashani in 1946. In 1947 he launched the East Pakistan Students Federation, the earliest left-wing student organisation in East Bengal. He was associated with the floating of Awami Muslim League in 1949.

Bengali Language Movement
Toaha was first active during the initial stages of the Bengali language movement. On 11 March 1948, when a team led by Toaha went to Secretariat to give Khawaja Nazimuddin a memorandum, police arrested him. Later he was tortured by them and had to spend a week in the hospital for recovery. As one of the leaders of the Rashtrabhasha Shangram Committee (State Language Committee of Action), Toaha was used to take part in all the meeting with the government. He was also the VP of the Fazlul Haque Hall of Dhaka University. When Muhammad Ali Jinnah went there, Toaha submitted a memorandum to him about their language demand. He was also vocal at the government's attempt to write Bengali in Arabic script. He was the correspondent of Jubo League at Shorbodolio Kendrio Rashtrabhasha Kormoporishod (All-party Central Language Committee of Action). Later part of 1952, he was arrested for attachments in student politics.

1954–1970
After his release in 1954, he took part in the election that the United Front won. There he was elected as a member of the Provincial Assembly. In 1956 he floated a labour organization styled as Purba Pakistan Majdur Federation and was elected its president. In 1957, Toaha was associated with the National Awami Party of  Abdul Hamid Khan Bhashani and was later elected its general secretary. With the promulgation of martial law by Ayub Khan in 1958, Toaha receded to underground politics. In 1969 he became one of the organizers of the anti-Ayub movement.

Bangladesh Liberation War

Toaha along with communists Sukhendu Dastider and Abdul Haq of the East Pakistan Communist Party (Marxist–Leninist) refused to participate in the liberation war for Bangladesh.

Post-liberation politics
After the independence of Bangladesh, a warrant was issued against him and he went into hiding. After the withdrawal of warrant in 1976 he came back to open politics. He was elected a member of the Jatiya Sangsad in 1979. In 1986, Toaha contested in the Jatiya Sangsad election as a nominee of 8-Party alliance.

Death
Toaha died on 29 November 1987 at his native village of Hajirhat, Lakshmipur District.

References

1922 births
1987 deaths
University of Calcutta alumni
Bangladeshi politicians
Pakistani politicians